The Oakland Athletics' 1998 season saw the A's finish with a record of 74 wins and 88 losses. The campaign was the first of the Billy Beane era. While the Athletics finished a distant fourth in the AL West, they improved upon the prior year's dismal output of 65-97.

The strong play of Jason Giambi, Matt Stairs and Kenny Rogers highlighted an otherwise forgettable campaign. Rogers' performance was particularly impressive; in arguably the finest season of his career, he won 16 games and posted a 3.17 earned run average (both were the best full-season marks by an Athletics starter since 1992). Additionally, the 1998 season marked Rickey Henderson's fourth (and final) stint with the Athletics. Henderson, at the age of 39, stole a total 66 bases; this total lead the league in that category. Lastly, rookie Ben Grieve collected a Rookie of the Year (ROY) award for his solid debut season. The award was the Athletics' first since Walt Weiss received one in 1988.

The Athletics posted a winning record in 1999. The organization, under Beane, would not post another losing season until 2007.

Offseason
 October 29, 1997: Dane Johnson was selected off waivers from the Athletics by the Toronto Blue Jays.
 November 7, 1997: The Athletics traded a player to be named later to the New York Yankees for Kenny Rogers and cash. The Athletics completed the deal by sending Scott Brosius to the Yankees on November 18.
 November 18, 1997: Tony Batista was drafted from the Athletics by the Arizona Diamondbacks as the 27th pick in the 1997 MLB Expansion Draft.
 November 26, 1997: David Newhan and Don Wengert were traded by the Athletics to the San Diego Padres for Jorge Velandia and Doug Bochtler.
 November 22, 1997: Damon Berryhill was signed as a free agent by the Athletics.
 December 4, 1997: Mark Acre was purchased from the Athletics by the Yakult Swallows.
 December 5, 1997: Jack Voigt was signed as a free agent by the Athletics.
 December 16, 1997: Mike Blowers was signed as a free agent by the Athletics.
 December 22, 1997: Izzy Molina was signed as a free agent by the Athletics.
 January 22, 1998: Rickey Henderson was signed as a free agent by the Athletics.
 March 9, 1998: Kevin Mitchell was signed as a free agent by the Athletics.
 March 17, 1998: Ernie Young was purchased from the Athletics by the Kansas City Royals.
 March 25, 1998: Doug Bochtler was purchased from the Athletics by the Detroit Tigers.

Regular season

Opening Day starters
Rafael Bournigal
Tom Candiotti
Jason Giambi
Ben Grieve
Rickey Henderson
A. J. Hinch
Dave Magadan
Jason McDonald
Scott Spiezio
Matt Stairs

Season standings

Record vs. opponents

Notable transactions
 June 2, 1998: 1998 Major League Baseball draft
Mark Mulder was drafted by the Athletics in the 1st round (2nd pick). Player signed October 9, 1998.
Eric Byrnes was drafted by the Athletics in the 8th round. Player signed June 12, 1998.
 June 26, 1998: Aaron Small was selected off waivers from the Athletics by the Arizona Diamondbacks.
 August 7, 1998: Kevin Mitchell was released by the Athletics.
 August 9, 1998: Jack Voigt was acquired from the Athletics by the Texas Rangers in a conditional deal.

Roster

Player stats

Batting

Starters by position
Note: Pos = Position; G = Games played; AB = At bats; R = Runs; H = Hits; HR = Home runs; RBI = Runs batted in; Avg. = Batting average; Slg. = Slugging average; SB = Stolen bases

Other batters 
Note: G = Games played; AB = At bats; H = Hits; Avg. = Batting average; HR = Home runs; RBI = Runs batted in

Pitching

Starting pitchers 
Note: G = Games pitched; IP = Innings pitched; W = Wins; L = Losses; ERA = Earned run average; SO = Strikeouts

Other pitchers 
Note: G = Games pitched; IP = Innings pitched; W = Wins; L = Losses; ERA = Earned run average; SO = Strikeouts

Relief pitchers 
Note: G = Games pitched; W = Wins; L = Losses; SV = Saves; ERA = Earned run average; SO = Strikeouts

Farm system

References

1998 Oakland Athletics team at Baseball-Reference
1998 Oakland Athletics team page at www.baseball-almanac.com

Oakland Athletics seasons
Oakland Athletics season
Oak